Tegan is a given name of Welsh origin. It is a diminutive of the Welsh word teg ('fair') 
and means 'darling', 'loved one', or 'favourite', and is the normal Welsh word for 'toy'.

People with the name
Notable people with the first name Tegan include:
Tegan Higginbotham (born 1988), Australian comedian and actress
Tegan Martin (born 1992), Australian model and beauty pageant titleholder, Miss Universe Australia 2014, and Top 10 Miss Universe 2014
Tegan McCarthy (born 1997), Papua New Guinean swimmer
Tegan Moss (born 1985), Canadian actress
Tegan Philip (born 1988), Australian netball player
Tegan Quin (born 1980), Canadian singer-songwriter, half of the duo Tegan and Sara

Fictional characters
Tegan Callahan, fictional character in the Australian television series Home and Away
Tegan Freedman, fictional character in the Australian television series Neighbours
Tegan Jovanka, fictional character in the British television series Doctor Who
Tegan Lomax, fictional character in the British television series Hollyoaks
PC Tegan Thompson, fictional character in the British television series No Offence
 Tegan Price, fictional character in the US television series How to Get Away with Murder

See also
 Teegan, a Cornish male and female name 
 Teagan, a surname and Irish female given name

References

English-language unisex given names
Welsh feminine given names